Thumper is a 2017 crime thriller directed and written by Jordan Ross and starring Eliza Taylor, Lena Headey, Pablo Schreiber, Ben Feldman, Daniel Webber, and Grant Harvey. The film premiered at the 2017 Tribeca Film Festival and was released November 7, 2017.

Premise 

New girl Kat Carter (Eliza Taylor) befriends classmate Beaver (Webber) in a community where drugs and violence run rampant and realizes how deep the drug problem is. Harbouring a dark secret of her own, she attracts the attention of the leader of a drug ring, Wyatt (Schreiber).

Cast 
 Eliza Taylor as Kat Carter/Meredith
 Pablo Schreiber as Wyatt Rivers
 Lena Headey as Ellen
 Ben Feldman as Jimmy
 Daniel Webber as Beaver
 Grant Harvey as Troy

Production

Casting 
It was announced in April 2016 that Eliza Taylor and Daniel Webber had joined the cast of the film.

Release 
The film had its worldwide premiere at the 2017 Tribeca Film Festival on April 20, 2017. On June 5, 2017, it was announced that The Orchard had bought Thumper and it was given a limited release on November 7, 2017.

Reception

Critical response 
On review aggregator Rotten Tomatoes, the film has an approval rating of 86%, with an average rating of 6/10.

Frank Sheck of The Hollywood Reporter gave the film mixed reviews. Though he found Taylor a "talented, vivacious performer" he failed to find her role in the film convincing. On the other hand, he  praised Schreiber, who he said "delivered a suitably intense and charismatic performance". However, he found the film unable to overcome its cliches.

References 

2017 films
2017 crime thriller films
Films about drugs
American crime thriller films
Torture in films
2010s English-language films
2010s American films